Farah Maalim Mohamed is a Kenyan politician who served as Lagdera MP from 1992 to 1997, and then from 2007 to 2013. He then moved to Dadaab constituency in 2022. He is an advocate of the High Court of Kenya . He is a parliamentarian and the former Deputy Speaker of the National Assembly of Kenya, and has over thirty years of experience on the Kenyan political scene. He is of Somali ethnicity.

Biography
Maalim belongs to an ethnic Somali family. He was educated at Maseno School, and he studied for an MA in Development Studies at [./Https://mstcdc.or.tz/ MS-TCDC], and studied law at the University of Nairobi, before enrolling to the Kenya School of Law for the statutory post graduate law course that is a prerequisite to admission to the Kenyan roll of advocates. He is a member of the Wiper Democratic Movement political party in Kenya, and was elected to represent the Lagdera Constituency in the National Assembly of Kenya in the 10th Kenyan Parliament. He had previously served in the 7th Kenyan Parliament.

In November 2012, Maalim led a group of MPs, which accused Kenyan soldiers of fomenting violence and using undue force during a security operation in Garissa. The legislators threatened to take the matter to the International Court of Justice (ICJ) if the perpetrators were not brought to justice. Maalim also suggested that the deployment of the soldiers was unconstitutional and had not received the requisite parliamentary approval, and that the ensuing rampage cost Garissa entrepreneurs over Sh1.5 billion to Sh2billion in missed revenue.

In the 2013 elections, Maalim ran for the Garissa County Senate seat, but was defeated by Yusuf Haji.

In the 2022 elections, Maalim was elected Wiper MP for Dadaab with a landslide win against Abdikheir Abdullahi Dubow who was backed by then the immediate MP Hon. Mohamed Dahir Duale.

References

1948 births
Living people
Orange Democratic Movement politicians
Members of the National Assembly (Kenya)
Kenyan people of Somali descent
Alumni of Maseno School
Members of the 13th Parliament of Kenya
21st-century Kenyan politicians